Yusuf Otubanjo (born 12 September 1992) is a Nigerian professional footballer who plays as a striker for Armenian Premier League club Pyunik.

Career

Club
On 23 January 2020, Ararat-Armenia announced the signing of Otubanjo. On 4 June 2022, Ararat-Armenia announced that Otubanjo's contract had expired and he would leave the club.

On 11 June 2022, Otubanjo signed for fellow Armenian Premier League club Pyunik.

Career statistics

Club

Honours
MŠK Žilina
Fortuna Liga: 2016–17

Ararat-Armenia
Armenian Premier League: 2019–20

References

External links
 Futbalnet profile 
 
 
 

1992 births
Living people
People from Ijebu Ode
Nigerian footballers
Association football forwards
Nigeria youth international footballers
Bridge F.C. players
Gateway United F.C. players
Crown F.C. players
Atlético Madrid C players
FC Red Bull Salzburg players
FC Juniors OÖ players
FC Blau-Weiß Linz players
MŠK Žilina players
SC Rheindorf Altach players
LASK players
FC Ararat-Armenia players
Tercera División players
Austrian Football Bundesliga players
Austrian Regionalliga players
Slovak Super Liga players
Armenian Premier League players
Nigerian expatriate footballers
Nigerian expatriate sportspeople in Spain
Expatriate footballers in Spain
Nigerian expatriate sportspeople in Austria
Expatriate footballers in Austria
Nigerian expatriate sportspeople in Slovakia
Expatriate footballers in Slovakia
Nigerian expatriate sportspeople in Armenia
Expatriate footballers in Armenia